Pullur  or "Pulloor" is a village in Thalakkad near the town of Tirur, in  Malappuram district in the state of Kerala, India.

References

Villages in Malappuram district